Melissa Naschenweng (born July 11, 1990) is an Austrian musician and schlager singer.

Discography

Studio albums

Compilations

Singles 
 2015: Federleicht
 2016: Die ganze Nacht
 2017: Braungebrannte Haut

References

External links 
 
 

1990 births
21st-century Austrian women singers
Schlager musicians
Living people